Wneg or WNEG may refer to:

 WNEG (AM), a radio station (630 AM) licensed to Toccoa, Georgia, United States
 WGTA (TV), a television station (channel 32) licensed to Toccoa, Georgia, United States that previously used the "WNEG-TV" callsign
 Weneg (pharaoh), Egyptian pharaoh of the second dynasty